The Occidental–Whittier football rivalry was a college football rivalry between the Occidental College Tigers and the Whittier College Poets, both members of the Southern California Intercollegiate Athletic Conference.  The rivalry has been played 108 times, renewed annually since 1907, except for interruptions during the World Wars and in 2017.  By 1935, the Los Angeles Times was already referring to the Tigers and Poets as "old rivals".  The schools met twice in the years of 1913, 1984, and 1989, the latter two due to the SCIAC's doubling up of one opponent per season in the 1980s.  The game is often referred to as the Shoes Game, as the winner maintains possession of Myron Claxton's bronzed shoes as a trophy.  Over its more than 100-year history, the rivalry has been relatively even, with Oxy maintaining a 56-51-2 edge.  Whittier dominated the rivalry from the 1950s through the 1970s, but Oxy has won 27 of the last 35 games since 1983.  Following the abandonment of Occidental's 2017 football season, no game was played in 2017, but the series resumed in 2018.  The series is on hiatus following Occidental's discontinuation of its football program amidst the coronavirus pandemic, and Whittier's discontinuation of football following the 2022 season.

Myron Claxton's Shoes
Prior to the 1939 game between the two schools, Occidental decided to steal the shoes of Little All-American running back (and future Whittier mayor) Myron Claxton in an attempt to hinder his performance.  Claxton played in his work boots, and Whittier went to Oxy and won 36–0.  Following the game, Claxton went to the Oxy sideline and reclaimed his shoes.  After the Second World War, Claxton's shoes were bronzed by Whittier College's Franklin Society and became a trophy that the winner of the game maintains possession of for a year.  In anticipation of winning this trophy, both teams have been known to shout "Shoes!" as a rallying cry.  The Shoes were featured on a 2013 episode of ESPN's College Gameday broadcast from the University of Southern California.

Game results

See also  
 List of NCAA college football rivalry games

References

College football rivalries in the United States
Occidental Tigers football
Whittier Poets football
1907 establishments in California